Elina Uzhakhova (born 18 July 1982) is a Kazakhstani sprint canoer who competed in the mid-2000s. At the 2004 Summer Olympics, she was eliminated in the semifinals of the K-2 500 m event.

External links
Sports-Reference.com profile

1982 births
Canoeists at the 2004 Summer Olympics
Kazakhstani female canoeists
Living people
Olympic canoeists of Kazakhstan
Asian Games medalists in canoeing
Canoeists at the 2002 Asian Games
Medalists at the 2002 Asian Games
Asian Games silver medalists for Kazakhstan
21st-century Kazakhstani women